FC Volna Nizhny Novgorod Oblast is a Russian football team based in Kovernino.

Club history
It was founded in 2016 and played on the amateur level as FC Volna Kovernino. For 2020–21 season, it received the license for the third-tier Russian Professional Football League. For the occasion, it also changed the name to represent the whole Nizhny Novgorod Oblast. The club did not receive professional license for the 2022–23 season and moved down to amateur levels.

References

Association football clubs established in 2016
Football clubs in Russia
Sport in Nizhny Novgorod Oblast
2016 establishments in Russia